John Lucian Savage (December 25, 1879 – December 28, 1967) was an American civil engineer. Among the 60 major dams he supervised the designs for, he is best known for the Hoover Dam, Shasta Dam, Parker Dam and Grand Coulee Dam in the United States along with surveying for the future Three Gorges Dam in China. He was a member of the National Academy of Sciences and the recipient of numerous awards including the John Fritz Medal.

Biography

Early life

John L. Savage was born on December 25, 1879, in Cooksville, Wisconsin, to Edwin Parker and Mary Therese Savage. Raised on a farm, Savage was involved in numerous chores and labor while attending grade school. Savage later attended the Hillside Home School after he earned tuition and board for two years. After Savage graduated from Madison High School, he attended the University of Wisconsin. During the summer of his freshmen year helped work on the Geological Survey of Wisconsin. During the summers of his sophomore and junior years, he conducted surveying with the United States Geological Survey. Savage graduated from the University of Wisconsin in 1903 with a B.S. in Civil Engineering.

Professional life

U.S. Bureau of Reclamation, Idaho Division

In 1903, Savage took an engineering aid job with the United States Bureau of Reclamation, Idaho Division. Before leaving that position in 1908, Savage worked on his first dam, the Minidoka Project. In Idaho, Savage also worked on the Payette-Boise Canal System, the Boise River Diversion Dam and the Upper and Lower Deer Flat Dams.

A. J. Wiley Engineering Association

In 1908, after leaving the U.S. Bureau of Reclamation Idaho Division, Savage began an eight-year association with A. J. Wiley, an engineer in Boise, Idaho. Their engineering practice boomed because of increased water use by the private sector for agriculture. Savage spent the majority of his time in the association inspecting and consulting on projects. During his time with Wiley, Savage worked on the Salmon River Dam, the Swan Falls Power Plant on the Snake River, the Barber Dam on the Boise River, the Twin Falls North Side Canal System, and the American Falls Power Plant. Savage also designed the gates for the Arrowrock Dam on the Boise River.

U.S. Bureau of Reclamation, Chief Engineer Office

After working with A.J. Wiley and buying a cattle ranch in Idaho, Savage returned to the U.S. Bureau of Reclamation in the office of the Chief Engineer. There he became the first designing engineer of the Bureau and later, between 1924 and 1945, served as the chief designing engineer in charge of all civil, electrical, and mechanical design. While in this position, Savage's supervisor, the Chief Engineer, allowed him to work in an independent capacity because of his abilities. With this, Savage was responsible for the designing of large projects, such as the Hoover Dam, the Parker Dam, the Shasta Dam, the All American Canal System and the Grand Coulee Dam.

Official overseas consulting

While with the U.S. Bureau of Reclamation, Savage became a renowned expert on dams and civil engineering; he consulted in 19 countries on hundreds of projects. In 1938, the Government of New South Wales asked Savage to consult on the Burrinjuck Dam in Australia after fears that the dam wall was unstable. Initially, Savage was not allowed to go because of a U.S. law forbidding federal employees from accepting money from foreign powers. Savage refused any payments and offered his services anyway, writing his superiors: "Any assistance will be gratis and I shall not accept any reimbursement for expenses. An overdue vacation will be sufficient gratuity."

After serving Mexico, in 1941, the United States Congress unanimously passed legislation allowing Savage to officially consult in India, Australia, and other countries. In Australia, Savage was consulted during the construction of the Upper Yarra and Warragamba Dams. Savage consulted on several dams in Afghanistan for the purpose of irrigation. In Switzerland, he consulted on the design and construction of the Grande Dixence Dam. He also consulted on numerous projects in India, Palestine and Spain.

In 1944, the Chairman of the Nationalist Government of China, Chiang Kai-shek invited Savage to China, where he surveyed and designed his "dream dam". At the time, the project was known as the Yangtze Gorge Project and would help irrigate  of land and control the Yangtze River, which was prone to deadly floods. When Savage returned, he published his report titled "Yangtze Gorge and Tributary Project" in which he stated in the preface: "The Yangtze Gorge Project is a ‘CLASSIC'." He also stated that it would bring employment and a higher standard of living in China. On June 3, 1946, the first of the dams he suggested, the Upper Tsing Yuan Tung, began but was halted on August 15, 1947, because of the Chinese Civil War. His dream, would be a reality almost 60 years later; standing as the Three Gorges Dam, one of the largest dams and supplying the largest power plant in the world.

Retirement

John L. Savage retired from the U.S. Bureau of Reclamation in 1945 but continued to consult in countries such as Afghanistan, South Africa, India, Singapore, Formosa, Japan, Mexico, Canada and Australia.

Legacy

John L. Savage was known as an exemplary and diligent worker among his peers, often seeing engineering problems before they arose. Savage's peers often referred to him as the first "billion dollar" American engineer because of the costs of the projects he designed and supervised. He was also known by some as "Jack Dam" Savage. Savage never saw money as an object of his work and once said that he took pleasure in joining "enterprises that have as their objective the development of human relations."

During Savage's 1945 John Fritz Medal award ceremony, the following was said: "Among Savage's major satisfactions is that of having seen the West grow and thrive as a result of the Bureau of Reclamation program for power and irrigation. Nearly 5,000,000 people—one out of every five living in the seventeen Western states—are dependent in one way or another on the facilities designed under his supervision."

Personal life 

John L. Savage was married twice and never fathered any children. Savage first married Jessie Burdick Sexsmith on June 1, 1918, but she died on July 17, 1940. Savage's second marriage was to Olga Lacher Miner on January 14, 1950. Although childless, Savage helped fund several of his nieces and nephews through college. In addition, he brought home an orphaned child from his trip to China.

John L. Savage died on December 28, 1967, in Englewood, Colorado.

Contributions to civil engineering

When designing the Hoover Dam, Savage introduced artificially cooled mass concrete, which dramatically reduced the setting time of concrete, allowing for faster construction. He also introduced the trial load method of arch analysis, which removed theorized and actual stresses in a finished structure. While designing the Grand Coulee Dam, Savage and his assistants solved an engineering problem of "twists" by leaving  gaps in a dam structure called "twist adjustment slots" in order to provide "give" as hydrostatic pressure amounted on a concrete dam, preventing cracking.

Savage and his associates developed methods and equipment that determined the stress on penstocks — pipes responsible for directly transferring water to generators in hydroelectricity power plants. They also studied the behavior of concrete and rolled-earth dams as well as the seismic and land subsidence effects caused by the weight of large reservoirs.

Awards

Education
Bachelor of Science, Civil Engineering, University of Wisconsin, 1903

Honorary degrees
D.Sc., University of Wisconsin, 1934
D.Sc., University of Denver, 1946
D.Eng., University of Colorado, 1947

Professional
Colorado Engineering Council's Gold Medal Award, 1937
Gold Medal Award of the National Resources Commission of China, 1944
John Fritz Medal, 1945
Henry C. Turner Gold Medal Award, 1946
National Academy of Sciences Election, 1949
Washington Award, 1949
U.S. Department of Interior Gold Medal Award, 1950
Reclamation Hall of Fame, May 1950
Popular Mechanics Hall of Fame, 1952
"Order of Ching Hsin" (China), 1952

References

External links

John Lucian Savage – National Academy of Sciences Biography
John Lucian Savage papers at the University of Wyoming – American Heritage Center

1879 births
1967 deaths
American civil engineers
American canal engineers
University of Wisconsin–Madison College of Engineering alumni
Members of the United States National Academy of Sciences
People from Porter, Wisconsin
United States Bureau of Reclamation personnel
John Fritz Medal recipients
Engineers from Wisconsin